Austin & Shambleau was an American architectural partnership in South Bend, Indiana, in the United States. It was founded by Ennis R. Austin and N. Roy Shambleau and operated from 1909 to 1942. It has been described as "the most distinguished architectural firm in Northern Indiana" of the early twentieth century.

Partner biographies
Ennis Raymond Austin was born August 30, 1863, in Owasco, New York, to John R. Austin. He attended public schools before entering Cornell University, graduating in 1886. For a year after his graduation he worked for Napoleon LeBrun & Sons, and then moved to the Tiffany Glass and Decorating Company, working under the supervision of John du Fais for four years. In 1892 he and a Tiffany colleague, Wilson B. Parker, moved west to South Bend to establish an architectural firm, Parker & Austin. In 1896 Austin became a member of the American Institute of Architects. Austin's partnership was dissolved in 1900 when he received an appointment as a construction superintendent in the Office of the Supervising Architect for the United States Treasury. In 1906 he returned to South Bend and formed the firm of Schneider & Austin with Walter W. Schneider. This partnership was dissolved in 1909, when he formed Austin & Shambleau with N. Roy Shambleau. This continued until its dissolution in 1942. He maintained a small private practice until his retirement in 1949. He died January 15, 1951, and was buried in his native town.

Norman Roy Shambleau was born in 1888 in London, Ontario, to the carriage-maker P. E. Shambleau. At the age of eleven the family moved to Detroit, and at the age of seventeen Shambleau came to South Bend, entering the office of Wilson B. Parker. He worked for Parker and other South Bend architects until 1909, when he formed the partnership with Austin. After the firm was dissolved in 1942, Shambleau succeeded to the practice. He practiced independently at least through the late 1950s. He died in 1975.

Legacy
A number of the firm's works are listed on the United States National Register of Historic Places, and others contribute to listed historic districts.

Architectural works

References

Architecture firms based in Indiana
South Bend, Indiana